Nyala is a TrueType font based on Sylfaen and designed to support the Latin alphabet and the Ge'ez script used in Ethiopic languages. It was created by John Hudson of Tiro Typeworks, based on drawings by Geraldine Wade, and is part of Windows Vista, Windows Server 2008, Windows 7, and Windows 8. The font is named for the mountain nyala, a species of great African antelope native to the highlands of Ethiopia.

References 

Unicode typefaces
Windows Vista typefaces
Semi-serif typefaces
Typefaces and fonts introduced in 2003
Typefaces designed by John Hudson